Anthony Richard Pulis (born 16 January 1958) is a Welsh football manager and former footballer who last managed Sheffield Wednesday.

Pulis obtained his FA coaching badge at age 19, followed by his UEFA 'A' licence aged 21 – making him one of the youngest professional players ever to have obtained the qualification. His son, Anthony, was a professional footballer and played at Stoke. Pulis had a 17-year career as a defender where he played for Bristol Rovers, Newport County, AFC Bournemouth and Gillingham. He also had a short spell in Hong Kong with Happy Valley.

Pulis took his first steps into management at Bournemouth, where he was a player/coach and then Harry Redknapp's assistant. He then took control when Redknapp left the club. He then went on to Gillingham before leaving in 1999 after a dispute with chairman Paul Scally. Pulis then had unsuccessful spells at Bristol City and Portsmouth before being appointed manager of Stoke City in 2002. He guided Stoke through a tough 2002–03 season avoiding relegation to the Second Division on the final day of the season. He spent two more seasons with Stoke before being sacked by Stoke's Icelandic board for "failing to exploit the foreign market". He spent the 2005–06 season at Plymouth Argyle before returning to Stoke along with Peter Coates. After narrowly missing out on a play-off spot in the 2006–07 season he guided Stoke to the Premier League in the 2007–08 season by finishing runners-up in the Championship.

With Stoke amongst the favourites for relegation upon their return to the top flight after a 23-year absence, Stoke went on to comfortably survive and finished in 12th position. Pulis made history during the 2010–11 season as he guided Stoke to their first FA Cup Final after beating Bolton Wanderers 5–0 in the semi-final. The Potters, however, lost the final 1–0 to Manchester City, but had the consolation of qualifying for European football. In the UEFA Europa League, Stoke lost 2–0 on aggregate in the round of 32 to Spanish giants Valencia. The 2012–13 season saw Stoke make little progress and Pulis left the club by mutual consent on 21 May 2013.

Pulis returned to management on 23 November 2013 joining Crystal Palace on a two-and-a-half-year contract. He guided Palace away from relegation, to their highest Premier League finish of 11th in 2013–14, which earned him the Premier League Manager of the Season award. He left the club, however, shortly before the start of the subsequent season. He joined West Bromwich Albion in January 2015, a post he held until November 2017. Pulis achieved a top half finish with West Brom in the 2016–17 season, finishing 10th, but the club made a poor start to the following season, culminating in his sacking. On Boxing Day 2017, Pulis was appointed manager of Middlesbrough, a post he held until May 2019. On 13 November 2020, Pulis returned to management when he was named manager of Sheffield Wednesday; however, on 28 December, he was sacked after 10 games in charge.

Playing career
Pulis began his career at Bristol Rovers where he joined their school of football excellence in Eastville from Newport YMCA. Pulis cites his time at Eastville as an excellent grounding with his Rovers teammate and friend Ian Holloway also making it in football management. "We learned our trade at a football club with really, really good people who had old fashioned values," I truly believe that it's because of the way we were brought up back then that we have managed to go on and achieve what we have done in the game. "The basic principles were drilled into us, both on and off the pitch. Nothing was given to us and we had to work very, very hard for everything we got."

Pulis made 85 league appearances for the Pirates before leaving to join Hong Kong club Happy Valley AA in 1982. The club finished second in the Hong Kong First Division League and won the Hong Kong Senior Challenge Shield in his eight-month stint with the club. He then returned to Rovers the following year and made a further 45 league appearances before moving to his home town club Newport County in 1984. At Newport, Pulis became a popular member of the squad and his former County teammate David Giles believes Pulis was always destined for top-level management.

With County struggling financially, Harry Redknapp signed Pulis at AFC Bournemouth, spending three years at Dean Court before joining Gillingham in 1989 for £10,000 on a three-year deal. Gillingham manager Damien Richardson had envisaged utilising Pulis as a sweeper but his time in Kent was blighted by an injury suffered in a pre-season friendly against West Ham, limiting him to just 16 appearances. After contemplating a career outside of football and studying for a small business qualification Pulis returned to Bournemouth a year later for a free of £15,000 to take up a player/coach role. He made 16 appearances, scoring one goal, while in this role.

Managerial career

AFC Bournemouth
Pulis was promoted to the position of manager in 1992, following Harry Redknapp's decision to leave the club for Premier League side West Ham United. Pulis spent two seasons at Bournemouth, both seasons saw the "Cherries" finish in 17th position before moving on. During his time at the club Pulis spent less than £400,000 on transfers, but recouped nearly £2.7 million in player sales. Among his purchases was Steve Fletcher, signed from Hartlepool United for £30,000, who would go on to make a record 728 appearances for the Dorset side across two spells.

Gillingham
Pulis then joined Gillingham in the summer of 1995, whom he managed for a further four seasons, turning a team that had struggled at the very bottom of the Football League into a promotion winning one in his first season, and laying the foundations for the club's eventual elevation to the First Division for the first time in their history.

In the 1995–96 season the Kent side gained promotion after finishing second behind Preston North End, setting a record for the fewest goals conceded by a team in the course of a 46-game Football League season in the process, with goalkeeper Jim Stannard keeping 29 clean sheets. The following season Gillingham started poorly, sitting in the relegation places towards the end of 1996, but improved to finish in 11th place and just six points below the promotion play-off places. The 1997–98 season saw further improvement, with the Gills finishing in 8th place and missing out on the play-off places only on the goals-scored rule. 

In the 1999 Second Division play-off final, the "Gills" were 2–0 up with less than two minutes left, following goals by the prolific partnership of Robert Taylor and Carl Asaba, only to see Manchester City score twice, the equaliser in injury time, and after that win a penalty shoot-out 3–1. Following the defeat, Pulis was controversially sacked by the club amidst claims of gross misconduct. He later brought a £400,000 court case against Gillingham chairman Paul Scally for unpaid bonuses, which was settled out of court in 2001 for £75,000.

Bristol City
Pulis was appointed manager of Bristol City in July 1999, prior to the start of the 1999–2000 season. A previous long stint at bitter rivals Bristol Rovers meant that Pulis's appointment was met with mixed reception. He made several reasonably big purchases including Steve Jones and former Rovers player Peter Beadle, but his popularity hit an all-time low only six months into his term as manager and when rumours surfaced of a switch to Portsmouth, home fans chanted for him to leave. He moved on to Portsmouth shortly, where Milan Mandarić had recently taken over as chairman.

Portsmouth
In January 2000, Pulis left Bristol City to become manager of Portsmouth. He took Portsmouth from the bottom three to mid-table but lasted only ten months in the job before being sacked and being replaced by Steve Claridge in October 2000.

Stoke City
Pulis was then out of work for two years, before the resignation of Stoke City's manager Steve Cotterill early into the 2002–03 season led to Pulis being given the job that November. Pulis immediately found himself in a relegation battle and it looked likely that the club would be relegated back to the Second Division only a year after being promoted. Pulis, however, completed the signings of striker Ade Akinbiyi and goalkeeper Mark Crossley, on loan from Crystal Palace and Middlesbrough respectively, who helped turn around the club's bad run. Stoke avoided relegation on the final day of the 2002–03 season with a 1–0 win over Reading at the Britannia Stadium, with Akinbiyi scoring the only goal of the match. Pulis rates Stoke's survival in 2002–03 as one of his best achievements in management.

In the following season, 2003–04, Pulis guided the club to an 11th-place finish. Tensions grew between the manager and chairman, Gunnar Gíslason, in the 2004–05 season. Pulis was frustrated with his lack of transfer funds which led to Dave Brammer and Steve Simonsen, both of whom were free agents, being his only significant signings prior to the start of the season. Pulis, however, did add Anthony Pulis, his son, and Lewis Buxton to his squad in January 2005. The disagreement between Pulis and the club's Icelandic ownership culminated with Pulis parting company with the club on 28 June 2005. He was sacked for "failing to exploit the foreign transfer market" by then chairman Gíslason. Following his dismissal, Pulis bemoaned the club's decision to sell Ade Akinbiyi to Championship rivals Burnley, stating, "We sold our top scorer and never replaced him." Dutch manager Johan Boskamp was named as Pulis's successor on 29 June 2005, only a day after Pulis was sacked.

Plymouth Argyle
After a brief spell assisting with training sessions at Boston United (then managed by his friend Steve Evans), Pulis was appointed as manager at Championship side Plymouth Argyle in September 2005, managing to turn a floundering team into one that with the right investment could challenge for a top half/play off place in 2006–07. The turn-around coincided with the loan of West Ham United central defender Elliott Ward and the club improved even further with the permanent signing of Lilian Nalis from Sheffield United. Plymouth Argyle ended the season 14th in the Championship table.

Return to Stoke City

In May 2006, Pulis was the subject of an approach from former club Stoke, who had recently parted company with manager Johan Boskamp, following Peter Coates' takeover of the club. Plymouth reportedly turned down this approach. On 14 June 2006, however, it was announced that Pulis would be returning as manager of Stoke.

Pulis bolstered his squad for the 2006–07 season with the permanent additions of Danny Higginbotham, Ricardo Fuller and Vincent Péricard. His most notable coup was the loan signing of Lee Hendrie from Aston Villa. Hendrie's arrival along with the loan signings of Salif Diao, Andy Griffin and Rory Delap coincided with a change of form for the Potters following a poor start to the season. Stoke went as high as fourth in the table prior to the January transfer window.

Pulis was named Manager of the Month for April 2007 after Stoke picked up 11 points from 5 league games. This unbeaten run lifted Stoke to seventh in the table, on equal points with sixth-place Southampton. A 1–1 draw against Queens Park Rangers on the final day of the season, however, led to Stoke finishing eighth in the Championship. Pulis sold several key players prior to the 2007–08 season; club captain Danny Higginbotham was one of a number of players to depart, joining Sunderland for £3 million. Pulis, however, utilised the loan market again, signing five players on loan, including Ryan Shawcross from Manchester United, with a few of these loan signings joining on a permanent deal in the January transfer window.

Pulis guided Stoke City to promotion to the Premier League on the final matchday of the season, to be Stoke's first top flight campaign in 23 years. Upon promotion, Pulis admitted the need to strengthen his squad but he also made it clear that the club would not go 'over the top' with spending. Stoke's biggest summer signing was that of striker Dave Kitson, who joined from recently relegated Reading for £5.5 million. Kitson was followed by the captures of Seyi Olofinjana from Wolverhampton Wanderers for £3 million, Abdoulaye Faye from Newcastle United for £2.25 million, Amdy Faye from Charlton Athletic for an undisclosed fee, Andrew Davies joined for £1.2 million from Southampton, defender Ibrahima Sonko signed for an initial £2 million fee from Reading and former Potter Danny Higginbotham rejoined his former club from Sunderland for an undisclosed fee. Pulis was also prepared to move players on, including his son Anthony Pulis and striker Jon Parkin.

After a promising start to the Premier League season, Stoke's mid-season slump left them as one of the favourites for relegation. The January additions of Sheffield United's James Beattie and West Ham winger Matthew Etherington, however, helped rejuvenate their season. Stoke dipped in and out of the relegation zone until March, when a good run of form lifted them above the bottom three. Their 2–1 win away to Hull City on 9 May 2009 secured their Premier League survival. Pulis has received much praise for his work with Stoke on a limited budget, in particular his achievement of keeping them in the Premier League. He was mentioned as a possible candidate for the 2008–09 Premier League Manager of the Year award.

The following season saw Stoke consolidating their Premier League status rather than facing relegation, and also saw them reach the quarter-finals of the FA Cup with victories over York City, Arsenal and Manchester City before losing to Chelsea at Stamford Bridge. Stoke finished 11th in the Premier League with 47 points, a place higher and two points more than last season. Pulis made his 300th appearance as Stoke manager with a 3–0 win over Blackburn Rovers on 6 February 2010. The result was Stoke's largest top-flight win for nearly 24 years after a 4–0 win over Wolverhampton Wanderers in 1984. Following criticism from Fulham player Danny Murphy over the way Pulis sets his team out to play, Pulis decided to release a six-minute statement defending the management staff and club as well as questioning Murphy's agenda.

After a number of controversial refereeing decisions that went against Stoke, Pulis advocated the introduction of a relegation system for referees to stop poor decisions. He became only the third manager in Stoke's history to guide the club to the semi-finals of the FA Cup after a quarter-final victory over West Ham. They then went on to beat Bolton 5–0, making Pulis the first manager to guide Stoke to an FA Cup Final. Stoke, however, lost the final 1–0 to Manchester City, with Yaya Touré scoring the only goal. By reaching the final, Stoke qualified for the 2011–12 UEFA Europa League, after Manchester City confirmed a place in the UEFA Champions League. Club chairman Peter Coates said in May 2011 that Pulis is Stoke's greatest ever manager.

In the Europa League, Stoke were drawn against Croatian giants Hajduk Split, where Stoke won both legs 1–0 to become the first Stoke side to win a two-legged European tie. Pulis signed former England internationals Jonathan Woodgate and Matthew Upson on free transfers to strengthen his centre backs following the departure of Abdoulaye Faye. He took charge of his 800th competitive match in August 2011. On transfer deadline day, Pulis signed Cameron Jerome from Birmingham City as well as Tottenham Hotspur duo Peter Crouch and Wilson Palacios; Crouch, at a fee of £10 million, broke the club's transfer record for the fourth successive season. In the group stages of the Europa League, Stoke were drawn against Beşiktaş, Dynamo Kyiv and Maccabi Tel Aviv, and after a 1–1 draw against Kyiv in December, Stoke qualified for the knock-out stages. Pulis described the achievement as a "milestone" in the club's history. Stoke were handed a glamour tie against Spanish giants Valencia in the round of 32. He reached 400 matches as Stoke manager in January 2012. Stoke lost both legs against Valencia 1–0 and exited the Europa League. In the second leg in Valencia, Stoke took a largely reserve side and named just four substitutes which included academy captain Lucas Dawson. This attracted much criticism of Pulis by supporters but he defended his choice. Stoke finished the 2011–12 season in 14th position.

In the summer of 2012, Pulis was again busy in the transfer market, letting Ricardo Fuller leave bringing in a number of new midfield players. In came American duo Geoff Cameron and Maurice Edu, Scottish pair Jamie Ness and Charlie Adam, Wolverhampton Wanderers winger Michael Kightly, Blackburn's French prospect Steven Nzonzi and former England international striker Michael Owen. Stoke made a steady start to the 2012–13 season despite a tough opening set of fixtures. Pulis has stated that he would like to see out the remainder of his managerial career at Stoke and that he is starting to change his side's style of play. Stoke went on a ten match unbeaten run from 10 November to 29 December, and held one of the best defensive records in Europe.

Stoke, however, made a poor start to 2013 picking up just a point in January and a frustrating transfer window saw just two new arrivals American winger Brek Shea and England goalkeeper Jack Butland. Performances and results remained poor in February and Pulis came under heavy criticism from supporters after an uninspiring home defeat against West Ham. Victories against Queens Park Rangers and Norwich City saw Stoke avoid the threat of relegation and they finished the 2012–13 Premier League season in 13th position. It was a season of little progress at Stoke, and Pulis left the club on 21 May 2013 after a meeting with club chairman Peter Coates. Speaking after his departure, Pulis revealed that he was disappointed by Coates' decision but accepted his reasons. He was replaced by another Welsh manager, Mark Hughes.

Crystal Palace
On 23 November 2013, Pulis was appointed manager of Crystal Palace on a two-and-half-year contract, taking over from Ian Holloway. His first win came on 3 December 2013, a 1–0 home win against West Ham.  In the early part of 2014, the team went on a run of five consecutive victories, which included wins over Chelsea, Cardiff City, Aston Villa, Everton and West Ham. This run of form earned Palace mathematical safety and saw Pulis named as Manager of the Month for April 2014. Palace finished the 2013–14 Premier League season in 11th position with 45 points, which saw Pulis named as the Premier League Manager of the Year.

During the summer of 2014, Pulis was hired by the BBC to be a pundit for the 2014 FIFA World Cup in Brazil. When he was not working, he used his spare time watching other games to scout new players and to see different managers at work. Shortly before the start of the subsequent 2014–15 season, however, Pulis left the club "by mutual consent", saying that it was because he was not being backed in the transfer market by the Palace board. In November 2016, Pulis was ordered by a high court judge to pay Crystal Palace £3.7 million for fraudulent misrepresentation in a dispute with Steve Parish over a £2 million "survival" bonus paid to him on his request over two weeks earlier than contractually necessary the day before he announced his departure.

West Bromwich Albion
On 1 January 2015, Pulis was appointed head coach at West Bromwich Albion. He won his first game in charge 7–0 against Conference Premier side Gateshead in an FA Cup third round match. During the January transfer window, Pulis secured the services of former Manchester United midfielder Darren Fletcher, who Pulis soon promoted to first team captain, with Chris Brunt as deputy. Under Pulis, the "Baggies" went through February unbeaten, keeping three clean sheets in a row in the process. West Brom's form saw Pulis named as the Premier League Manager of the Month for February. West Brom secured victories over Chelsea and Manchester United, and Pulis duly led the team to a 13th-place finish in the Premier League.

For the 2015–16 season, Pulis signed striker Salomón Rondón for a club record fee of £12 million from Zenit Saint Petersburg.  Pulis's statement that he wanted Leicester City to win the 2015–16 Premier League and the motivation of his players was credited by The Daily Telegraph with spoiling their rivals Tottenham's celebration party. In the summer of 2016, Pulis was hired by ITV to be a pundit for UEFA Euro 2016 in France. He was used for his knowledge and previous punditry experience to commentate live on the Wales national football team. There were other games such as Spain–Turkey where Pulis also commentated live on the match.

Six games into the 2016–17 season, Pulis reached the milestone of 1,000 games as a professional manager which came against his former club, Stoke. At the end of October, Pulis signed a one-year extension to his contract. The extension committed him to the club until the summer of 2018.  As the season drew to a close Pulis was part of the six-man shortlist for the Premier League Manager of the Season award, eventually losing out to Chelsea manager Antonio Conte. The club finished in the top half of the table under his guidance, occupying 8th place for much of the season, before a poor run of only two points in their final nine games saw them drop to 10th.  On 11 August 2017, Pulis signed a further contract extension which committed him to the club until 2019. Upon signing he said: "I'm delighted to extend my contract because it continues the stability within the Club which is essential for its progress."

Pulis was sacked as West Brom manager on 20 November 2017, after a poor run of results where they had won only four of their last 22 Premier League games, a run stretching back to 2016–17. He left with West Brom occupying 17th place in the table. Throughout his tenure, concerns had been raised by supporters over his perceived "negative" brand of football, and a lack of progress at the club.

Middlesbrough
On 26 December 2017, Pulis was appointed as manager of Championship club Middlesbrough, replacing the sacked Garry Monk, who left the club ninth in the Championship table, after an indifferent first half to their season. On that same day as his appointment, Pulis was present in the stands to watch Middlesbrough, managed by Academy manager Craig Liddle in the interim period, defeat Bolton Wanderers 2–0 at the Riverside Stadium. Pulis's first match in charge of Middlesbrough ended in a 1–0 home defeat to Aston Villa.

Pulis's first win as Middlesbrough manager came on 1 January 2018, a comeback 3–2 victory at Preston North End. As the season continued, Middlesbrough temporarily began to suffer under the similar results under Pulis that they received under Monk's management, though Pulis turned the team's fortunes around, and they finished fifth, qualifying to the play-offs. However, they were defeated 1–0 by Villa, thus being confirmed as a Championship club for another season, much to the devastation of the club's fans, players and staff.

In Pulis's first full season as Middlesbrough, the team had a relatively strong run of results through to February, including a 3–2 away win against Pulis's previous club West Bromwich Albion.  His side went on to maintain a top six position until March, though a run of six consecutive defeats saw them drop out of the top six for the first time that season. At the end of the season, Pulis left the club when the decision was taken not to extend his contract.

Sheffield Wednesday
On 13 November 2020, Pulis returned to management after over a year out of football, joining Championship club Sheffield Wednesday, the second consecutive appointment for which he had replaced Garry Monk. He brought in Mike Trusson as his assistant manager and Craig Gardner as first-team coach during his first week. His first match in charge ended in a 1–0 defeat against Preston North End after Josh Windass was sent off, after 17 minutes. He got his first point the following game in another away game, a 1–1 draw against Swansea City, with Adam Reach getting the first goal of his reign. After the 2–0 defeat to Nottingham Forest, he broke the record for worst start for any manager at Sheffield Wednesday, getting 3 points from a possible 24. He won his first game as manager at the ninth time of asking against Coventry City in a 1–0 win, with Tom Lees getting the winning goal. On 28 December 2020, Pulis was sacked as Wednesday manager after having secured just one victory from ten league games. Sky Sports reported that major disagreements between Pulis and club owner Dejphon Chansiri over transfer plans for the upcoming January transfer window were the main cause of Pulis's dismissal. Chansiri later described his appointment of Pulis as a "mistake".

Style of management
Pulis has a reputation within the game for achieving solid results on small budgets and also maintains the proud record of never being relegated as a player, coach or manager. Throughout his managerial career Pulis has used the long ball style of play, and been known for placing an emphasis on defence and utilising set-pieces to pose a goal threat. He has a reputation for securing safety for struggling clubs, giving him a "Red Adair" type image which he finds frustrating. 

Stoke City chairman Peter Coates stated that Pulis had studied, and was influenced by, Italian styles of play, saying: "The so-called Catenaccio defensive system interested him and the Italians haven't done too badly, have they, with their four World Cups?"

Personal life
Pulis was born in the Pill area of Newport, in Wales. He was brought up there, with his father, Angelo, a steelworker, and his mother, Jean, as well as his brothers and sisters. Growing up in Newport, he supported Manchester United as well as attending matches at Cardiff City and Newport County. One of his brothers, Ray, also used to play for Newport and is currently chairman of Welsh non-league side Pill AFC. His son Anthony is a retired professional footballer who currently serves as an assistant coach for the Major League Soccer side Inter Miami CF. Pulis's former Bristol Rovers teammate Ian Holloway is Anthony's godfather. He also has a daughter, Stephanie whose partner, Jack Swann is an amateur footballer who played for Bournemouth Poppies. His grandfather was born in Ħaż-Żabbar, Malta before he moved to Wales.

Pulis was awarded an honorary degree at the University of Staffordshire on 10 July 2009. He received the reward for his contribution in helping sports journalism students at the university. He was also awarded the award at the University of Wales, Newport, on 15 April 2013. Pulis participated in the 2009 London Marathon to raise money for the Donna Louise Trust which assists a children hospice. He completed the marathon in 4 hours 31 minutes 57 seconds.
In May 2010, Pulis climbed to the summit of Mount Kilimanjaro with Nick Hancock to raise money for the Stoke-on-Trent based charity the Donna Louise Trust. In March 2012, he escaped a driving ban for speeding after his lawyer claimed that the city of Stoke-on-Trent would suffer as a result. On 31 May 2012, Pulis was an Olympic Torch bearer for the 2012 Summer Olympics. On 1 June 2015, Pulis completed a 450-mile rowing challenge from Tower Bridge in London to the Eiffel Tower in Paris. He once again teamed up with Nick Hancock and other team members for the Donna Louise Hospice in Stoke. The seven-day nautical challenge eventually raised over £250,000 for the charity.

Pulis is a Catholic and regularly attends church. His mother died on 13 September 2010, the same day that Stoke had a Monday night fixture against Aston Villa. Pulis made an unexpected return to the dug-out after the half-time break, having missed the first half, amidst huge applause from the home crowd. At this time, Villa were 1–0 up but goals from Kenwyne Jones and Robert Huth gave Stoke a 2–1 win and their first points of the season.

Career statistics

Player
 

A.  The "Other" column constitutes appearances and goals in the Anglo-Scottish Cup, Football League Trophy and Full Members Cup.

Manager

Honours

Player
Happy Valley
 Hong Kong Senior Challenge Shield: 1982–83

AFC Bournemouth
Football League Third Division: 1986–87

Manager
Gillingham
Football League Third Division runner-up: 1995–96

Stoke City
Football League Championship runner-up: 2007–08
FA Cup runner-up: 2010–11

Individual
Championship Manager of the Month: February 2005, April 2007, February 2008
Second Division Manager of the Month: February 1993
Third Division Manager of the Month: September 1995
Third Division Manager of the Season: 1995–96
Premier League Manager of the Month: April 2014, February 2015
Premier League Manager of the Season: 2013–14
Inducted into LMA Hall of Fame 2016–17

References

External links

Points are the prizes for Stoke boss Tony Pulis BBC Sport blog on Tony Pulis

1958 births
Living people
British people of Maltese descent
Welsh Roman Catholics
Footballers from Newport, Wales
Welsh footballers
Association football defenders
Bristol Rovers F.C. players
Happy Valley AA players
Newport County A.F.C. players
AFC Bournemouth players
Gillingham F.C. players
English Football League players
Hong Kong First Division League players
Welsh expatriate footballers
Welsh expatriate sportspeople in Hong Kong
Expatriate footballers in Hong Kong
Welsh football managers
AFC Bournemouth managers
Gillingham F.C. managers
Bristol City F.C. managers
Portsmouth F.C. managers
Stoke City F.C. managers
Plymouth Argyle F.C. managers
Crystal Palace F.C. managers
West Bromwich Albion F.C. managers
Middlesbrough F.C. managers
Sheffield Wednesday F.C. managers
Premier League managers
English Football League managers
Association football coaches